Rock'n'Roll Veterans is the second album by the Bulgarian rock musician Georgi Minchev who is also the producer of the work. It was released in 1989 by the state-owned record company Balkanton.

The songs of the album are result from the Minchev's collaboration with the well known Bulgarian musicians Kiril Marichkov, Petar Gyuzelev and Valdi Totev from Shturtsite and Rumen Boyadzhiev from FSB as well as Minchev's friend A. Dechev. That's why, in the album notes, Minchev wrote that he would like Rock'n'Roll Veterans to be perceived not just as a solo album but as album written by six friends.

The album was originally released on Cassette and Vinyl LP. In 1997, it was re-released on CD format together with the Minchev's first LP BG Rock (1987).

Track listing
All lyrics are written by Georgi Minchev.

Side A:
"Рокендрол ветерани" / "Rock'n'Roll Veterans" (Minchev/K. Marichkov) - 3:36
"Момчето и аз" / "The Boy and Me" (Minchev/A. Dechev) - 3:33
"Какви времена" / "What Times" (Minchev/K. Marichkov) - 3:58
"Полтъргайст" / "Poltergeist" (Minchev/V. Totev) - 3:17
"Семеен блус" / "Family Blues" (Minchev/P. Gyuzelev) - 4:48

Side B:
"Момчета с китари" / "Boys with Guitars" (Minchev/P. Gyuzelev) - 4:22 
"Мъж в гардероб" / "Man in Wardrobe" (Minchev/K. Marichkov) - 3:14
"Луди глави" / "Daredevils" (Minchev/V. Totev) - 2:47
"Рокендрол в събота" / "Rock'n'Roll on Saturday" (Minchev/P. Gyuzelev) - 4:26
"Една любов умря" / "One Love has Died" (Minchev/R. Boyadzhiev) - 4:52

Personnel
 Georgi Minchev - All Vocals
 Petar Gyuzelev - Guitars
 Kiril Marichkov - Bass Guitar
 Valdi Totev - Keyboards
 Rumen Boyadzhiev - Keyboards
 Georgi Markov - Drums
 Emanuil Manolov-Badema - Tenor Saxophone
 Dechko Delchev - Tenor Saxophone
 Valeri Gradinarski - Guitars
 Panayot Slavchev - Piano

References

External links
 Web page dedicated to Georgi Minchev 
 Bulgarian originals from the 1970s and 1980s
 1997 compilation BG Rock with Rock'n'Roll Veterans at bgestrada.com
 The song "Rock'n'Roll Veterans" at YouTube.

1989 albums
Georgi Minchev (musician) albums